Irene Desiree Hélène Hendriks (born 13 April 1958 in Ngaliema, Belgian Congo) is a former Dutch field hockey player, who won the golden medal with the National Women's Team at the 1984 Summer Olympics in Los Angeles, California.

From 1978 to 1985 Hendriks played a total number of 74 international matches for Holland, in which she scored twelve goals. She played in three World Cups.

External links
 
 Dutch Hockey Federation

1958 births
Living people
Dutch female field hockey players
Olympic field hockey players of the Netherlands
Olympic gold medalists for the Netherlands
Field hockey players at the 1984 Summer Olympics
Olympic medalists in field hockey
Radboud University Nijmegen alumni
Sportspeople from Kinshasa
Medalists at the 1984 Summer Olympics
21st-century Democratic Republic of the Congo people